Lietuvos istorijos metraštis is an academic journal covering the history of Lithuania published by the Lithuanian Institute of History. From 1971 to 2000 it was published once a year; since 2001 it is published twice a year. It is published in Lithuanian with summaries provided in English or German.

The journal publishes research articles by Lithuanian and foreign historians, archaeologists, ethnologists. It also publishes historical sources and reviews of recently published books.

As of 2020, 52 volumes  have been published.

Editors
The following persons are or have been editors-in-chief:
Bronius Vaitkevičius (1971–1987)
Vytautas Merkys (1988–2000)
Zigmantas Kiaupa (2001–2016)
Gintautas Sliesoriūnas (since 2017)

References

External links
  Full-text archives since 1971

Publications established in 1971
1971 establishments in Lithuania
European history journals
Lithuanian-language journals